Peder Johnsen (baptised 30 November 1783 – 10 June 1836) was a Norwegian sailor who served as a representative at  the Norwegian Constituent Assembly in 1814.

Peder Johnsen was born at Tvedestrand in Aust-Agder, Norway. He was the youngest of ten siblings. Johnsen served as a commissioner officer in the Royal Norwegian Navy. He was an accountant at Kristiansand  shipyard in Vest-Agder, before he was assigned as a midshipman. In later years, he was the captain of the bark De Tvende Brødre.

Peder Johnsen represented The Royal Norwegian Navy (Søe-Deffensionen) at the Norwegian Constituent Assembly.  together with  Jens Schow Fabricius,
Thomas Konow, and Even Thorsen. He belonged to the independence party (Selvstendighetspartiet).

In 1810, Peder Johnsen married Catharine Margrethe Nielsdatter (1788-1832). They were the parents of seven children. The family lived on Skippergata  street in the central business district of Kvadraturen in Kristiansand.

References

External links
Representantene på Eidsvoll 1814 (Cappelen Damm AS)

1783 births
1836 deaths
People from Tvedestrand
Royal Norwegian Navy personnel
Norwegian military personnel of the Napoleonic Wars
Fathers of the Constitution of Norway